Manchester is a city in Northwest England.  The M2 postcode area of the city includes part of the city centre, including the Central Retail District.  The postcode area contains 143 listed buildings that are recorded in the National Heritage List for England.  Of these, five are listed at Grade I, the highest of the three grades, 16 are at Grade II*, the middle grade, and the others are at Grade II, the lowest grade.

The area is important not only for retail, but also for commercial and civic functions.  The majority of the listed buildings date from the early 19th to the early 20th century, and many of them are elaborately designed and decorated, reflecting the economic prosperity of the city during this time.  The architectural styles employed include Classical, Greek Revival, Renaissance, Gothic, Romanesque, Venetian Gothic, Baroque, Queen Anne, and Edwardian Baroque.  Some of the buildings originated as warehouses that have been converted for other uses, and a number of these are in the style of an Italian palazzo.  Most of the buildings are shops, offices, houses, banks, and civic and public buildings, Other buildings include churches, statues, tombs, monuments, public houses, clubs, a former railway station now an exhibition centre, a fountain, war memorials, two electricity junction boxes, and a pair of telephone kiosks.


Key

Buildings

References

Citations

Sources

Lists of listed buildings in Greater Manchester
Buildings and structures in Manchester